Poggiardo railway station is a railway station in Poggiardo, Italy. The station is located on the Maglie-Gagliano del Capo railway. The train services and the railway infrastructure are operated by Ferrovie del Sud Est.

Train services
The station is served by the following service:

Local services (Treno regionale) Zollino - Maglie - Tricase - Gagliano

References

Railway stations in Apulia
Railway stations opened in 1910
Buildings and structures in the Province of Lecce